Kanchibiya District is a district of Muchinga Province, Zambia. It was separated from Mpika District in 2017.

References 

Districts of Muchinga Province